Soslanbek Arsenovich Arshiyev (born 1 January 1989) is a Russian professional footballer.

Club career
He made his professional debut in the Russian Second Division in 2006 for FC Saturn Yegoryevsk.

He made his Russian Football National League debut for FC KAMAZ Naberezhnye Chelny on 3 May 2009 in a game against FC Nosta Novotroitsk.

References

External links
 

1989 births
People from Irafsky District
Living people
Ossetian people
Russian footballers
Russian expatriate footballers
Association football goalkeepers
FC KAMAZ Naberezhnye Chelny players
FC Gornyak Uchaly players
Expatriate footballers in Lithuania
FC Znamya Truda Orekhovo-Zuyevo players
FC Spartak Vladikavkaz players
FC Dynamo Stavropol players
Russian expatriate sportspeople in Lithuania
Russian expatriate sportspeople in Armenia
Expatriate footballers in Armenia
FC Mashuk-KMV Pyatigorsk players
Sportspeople from North Ossetia–Alania